Jesús Puente Alzaga (18 December 1930 – 26 October 2000) was a Spanish actor. He appeared in more than one hundred films from 1957 to 2000.

In 1954 he represented The Taming of the Shrew of William Shakespeare at the Teatre Grec.

Selected filmography

1957: El hombre que viajaba despacito - Sargento instructor
1957: Las muchachas de azul - Don César
1958: Historias de Madrid - Cliente de la futuróloga
1958: El hereje
1958: The Christ of the Lanterns - Amigo de Antonio
1958: Red Cross Girls - Jugador en hipódromo
1959: Gayarre - Elorrio
1959: Ten Ready Rifles - Alguacil en Consejo de Guerra
1959: Bombas para la paz - Mr. Thompson, delegado estadounidense
1959: Los tramposos
1959: The Last Days of Pompeii - Roman Senator
1960: La fiel infantería - Cabo Silvestre
1960: Carnival Day - Locutor
1960: El indulto - Vigilante de patio
1960: La paz empieza nunca - Mencia
1960: Los económicamente débiles - Examinador Escuela de Entrenadores
1960: Trío de damas - Juan
1961: Usted puede ser un asesino - Ayudante de Comisario Serbel
1961: Ha llegado un ángel - Director
1961: Tres de la Cruz Roja - Capitán Martín
1961: Diferente - Christmas guest
1962: Teresa de Jesús - Corregidor
1962: Aprendiendo a morir - Marcos
1962: Accident 703 - Guardia Civil de tráfico
1962: Sabían demasiado - Don Cipriano, el comisario
1962: Escuela de seductoras - Marido de Milagros
1962: I tromboni di Fra Diavolo
1963: Rocío from La Mancha - Carlos
1963: Los conquistadores del Pacífico - Francisco Pizarro
1963: Eva 63 - Fernando
1964: Ella y el miedo - Conductor
1964: Apache Fury - Juez Todd Driscoll
1964: Cyrano and d'Artagnan - (uncredited)
1964: The Seven from Texas - Clifford
1964: Fin de semana - Miguel
1964: Damned Pistols of Dallas
1964: La hora incógnita - Marido de María
1965: Loca juventud - (uncredited)
1965: Per un pugno nell'occhio - Capitan Hernandez
1965: Más bonita que ninguna - Novio de Fany
1965: Behind the Mask of Zorro - Gobernador Alfonso de la Riva
1965: Ocaso de un pistolero - Sheriff Roger
1965: Adiós gringo - Sheriff Saul Slaughter
1966: Due mafiosi contro Al Capone - Tony
1966: Dollars for a Fast Gun - Frank Nolan
1966: Ypotron - Final Countdown - Wilson
1966: Un gangster venuto da Brooklyn
1967: Two Crosses at Danger Pass - Sheriff T. Mitchell
1967: The Cobra - Stiarkos
1967: The Million Dollar Countdown - Talbol
1967: Un hombre vino a matar - Alex Turner
1967: Bandidos
1968: Ringo the Lone Rider - Major Corbett
1968: Persecución hasta Valencia - Mohamed el Chulakei
1969: A Bullet for Rommel - Col. Wolf
1969: Tarzán en la gruta del oro - Julius
1969: One on Top of the Other - Sergeant Rodriguez
1969: A 45 revoluciones por minuto - Sr. Aranda
1969: El regreso de Al Capone - Al Capone
1970: Count Dracula - Minister of Interior (uncredited)
1970: Verano 70 - Dr. Valverde 'Paco'
1970: Por qué pecamos a los cuarenta - Luis
1970: Hatchet for the Honeymoon - Inspector Russell
1970: El mejor del mundo
1970: Crimen imperfecto - Comisario Montero
1970: El dinero tiene miedo - Sabastián - el mayordomo
1971: Marta - Don Carlos
1977: Obsesión - Ignacio
1979: El fascista, la beata y su hija desvirgada - Doctor (uncredited)
1979: Mi adúltero esposo ('In Situ') - Juan
1980: Despido improcedente - Andrés
1983: La avispita Ruinasa - Luis Viveos
1984: Gritos de ansiedad - Ángel
1984: Sesión continua - Federico Alcántara
1984: Memorias del general Escobar - General Rojo
1984: Violines y trompetas - Gabriel
1986: El orden cómico - Don Antonio López Terrón
1986: Romanza final - Doctor
1986: Los presuntos - Alejo
1986: Capullito de alhelí - Hilario
1987: La estanquera de Vallecas - Comisario Paíno
1987: Asignatura aprobada - José Manuel Alcántara
1987: Terroristas - Vargas
1987: Veredicto implacable - Inspector
1988: Caminos de tiza
1996: Eso - Realizador
2000: You're the One - Dr. Bermann (final film role)

References

External links
 
 

1930 births
2000 deaths
Male actors from Madrid
Spanish male film actors
Spanish male television actors
20th-century Spanish male actors